Adhemar Ferreira de Camargo Neto (born 27 April 1972), better known as Adhemar , is a Brazilian former footballer who played as a forward.

Career
Adhemar was born in Tatuí, Brazil.

Adhemar scored 22 goals at 2000 Brazilian National Championship leading São Caetano to a Championship final against Vasco da Gama, more than any other player. However, since São Caetano played for Copa João Havelange Group Yellow (second tier) before the round of 16, his goals scored at early stages were not counted for the Top Goalscorer award.

In January 2001, Adhemar joined VfB Stuttgart of the German Bundesliga, scoring a hat-trick on his league debut against 1. FC Kaiserslautern. He spent a season and a half with the club, making a total of 39 appearances and scoring nine goals in the German top flight.

Known for his powerful kicks, Adhemar was spotted by American football team Tampa Bay Buccaneers to become their kicker, having scored nine out of ten 50-yard field goals during his trial. Although interested in the offer, he refused claiming he did not want to part from his family after being told he should stay three months at the United States until he could get a work permit and allow them to join him.

On 2 March 2012, Adhemar came out of retirement to play at Campeonato Carioca third division for Serrano.

References

External links

 

1972 births
Living people
Brazilian footballers
Brazilian expatriate footballers
Associação Desportiva São Caetano players
São José Esporte Clube players
VfB Stuttgart players
Sport Club Corinthians Paulista players
Yokohama F. Marinos players
Seongnam FC players
K League 1 players
J1 League players
Expatriate footballers in Japan
Bundesliga players
Expatriate footballers in South Korea
Expatriate footballers in Germany
Brazilian expatriate sportspeople in Germany
Brazilian expatriate sportspeople in Japan
Brazilian expatriate sportspeople in South Korea
People from Tatuí
Association football forwards
Footballers from São Paulo (state)